State Highway 2 (SH 2) is a state highway of the U.S. state of Colorado. It is one of the major north–south thoroughfares of east Denver, where it is known as Colorado Boulevard.

Route description

On its southern end, it begins at U.S. Route 285 (US 285) in Cherry Hills Village in Arapahoe County just south of the Denver city limits. It goes north through Denver, intersecting Interstate 25 (I-25) and US 87 at exit 204. It intersects SH 83 near Cherry Creek and then US 40, US 287 and Interstate 70 Business (I-70 Bus.), which is also known as Colfax Avenue, east of downtown Denver. It passes along the east side of Denver City Park. It intersects I-70 at exit 276, then merges with US 6 and US 85 through Commerce City until it branches off from US 6 and US 85 to the northeast, passing along the northwest boundary of the Rocky Mountain Arsenal National Wildlife Refuge. It terminates at its northern end at I-76 and US 6 at exit 15 on the south edge of Brighton.

History

The route was established in the 1920s beginning at US 40 at the Utah border. It then followed US 40 all the way to Denver, where it followed Colfax Avenue through Denver. It then followed various streets northeast along US 85 north to Greeley, where it turned abruptly eastward along US 34 to US 6, where it continued to Sterling and finally along US 138 to the Nebraska border. By 1946, the route was rerouted in an Area northeast of Denver. It was then changed in 1950 so it followed Colfax Avenue east through Denver. The route was rerouted in 1968 from US 285 to I-80S (now I-76). The now-deleted portion along Quebec Street was changed in 1971, and the route was finally corrected to its current routing in 1998.

Major intersections

References

External links

002
Transportation in Denver
Transportation in Arapahoe County, Colorado
Transportation in Adams County, Colorado
Commerce City, Colorado